Dalnabreck is a small village, lying at the southwest end of Loch Shiel in Sunart, Lochaber, Scottish Highlands and is in the Scottish council area of Highland.

References

Populated places in Lochaber